Queen's Grant High School is a charter school in Matthews, North Carolina. The campus is on 32 acres, formerly Idlewild Country Club. It is an extension of Queen's Grant Community School, an NHA charter that offers grades K-8.

History 
Queen's Grant was formed in 2006, and opened in 2007 with ninth and tenth grades. The school rented space until 2009, when it first assembled modular units to accommodate over 400 students. 

In 2010, Queen's Grant appointed Principal Michael Smith, who was recruited by former Mint Hill, North Carolina Mayor Ted Biggers. Smith retired and was replaced by Josh Swartzlander in 2019.

Student life 
Students provide their own transportation to and from Queen's Grant. If students bring their own vehicles, parking on campus is free. Most trips and extracurricular activities also involve individual transportation. 

The school day lasts just under 7 hours for most students. Queen's Grant utilizes multiple online platforms for work and grade management, including Schoology and PowerSchool. Students are provided with Google Workspace accounts.

Queen's Grant offers catered lunch Monday through Friday. Regularly sold are Chick-Fil-A sandwiches and Harris Teeter sub sandwiches, accompanied by chips and drinks. Students have the option of eating at the school's outdoor dining area or inside classrooms. The school is not a member of the Federal Free and Reduced Lunch Program.

Queen's Grant has clubs in Student Council, Debate, Spanish Honor Society, International Thespian Society, Beta, Art, YCI, Gender and Sexuality Alliance, Latin, Junior Classical League, Drama, Jazz Band, Medical Careers, and National Honor Society.

Athletics 
Queen's Grant is a member of the North Carolina High School Athletic Association, with sports teams in: Soccer, Volleyball, Basketball, Softball, Baseball, Wrestling, Cross Country, Track, Cheerleading, and Lacrosse.

The school has soccer, softball, and baseball fields. It also features a half-mile cross country trail and a small volleyball area. All other athletic practices, games, and events are held off-site at various local facilities.

Building campaign 
In 2019, Queen's Grant announced plans to construct a building to be used as a student performance center and gymnasium. The school hopes to raise $5 million for the project.

During Summer 2022, Principal Josh Swartzlander announced plans via email to "embark on the construction of our new GYMPAC" in the fall.

School fundraising 
Queen's Grant utilizes a variety of fundraising methods. The school's student government also organizes events which generate revenue.  

 Spirit wear is sold via the school's Square site. Students can wear purchased items at any time throughout the year. Proceeds go towards technology improvements, campus maintenance, and more.
 Engraved bricks are sold, and will be added to the school's performing arts center/gymnasium upon the building's completion. Proceeds go directly towards the construction of the building.
 Jeans Days are held every Wednesday and Friday, with most proceeds benefiting school clubs. The cost is $1 to participate. Year-long jeans passes are also available for $100.
 The sale of Chick-Fil-A Sandwiches during school lunch often raises additional funds; these proceeds go towards Student Council events.

References

External links

Private schools in North Carolina
2007 establishments in North Carolina
Educational institutions established in 2007
Private high schools in North Carolina
Schools in Charlotte, North Carolina